Eriophyllum lanatum, with the common names common woolly sunflower, Oregon sunshine and golden yarrow, is a common, widespread, North American plant in the family Asteraceae.

Description
Both the stems and leaves may be covered with a woolly gray hair, but some plants lack this. The hairs conserve water by reflecting heat and reducing air movement across the leaf's surface.

Both the (8–12) ray and disk flowers are yellow, with one flower head on each flowering stalk. The flower heads have 6–14 rays, which are darker towards the base, and several disk flowers. They bloom from May to August. The seeds have scales at the tip.

Taxonomy
The Lewis and Clark Expedition reportedly saw this plant growing above their camp on the Clearwater River (near present-day Kamiah, Idaho), and collected two specimens on 6 June 1806. Botanist Frederick Traugott Pursh studied the plants collected on the expedition; his first classification and naming of the species, as Actinella lanata, was published in 1813.

The common name "woolly sunflower" is often used to describe any member of the genus Eriophyllum.

Varieties
Varieties include:
Eriophyllum lanatum var. achillioides (DC.) Jeps. — California, Nevada, Oregon.
Eriophyllum lanatum var. arachnoideum (Fisch. & Avé-Lall.) Jeps. — Spiderweb sunflower; endemic to the California Coast Ranges from Del Norte County to Monterey County in California.
Eriophyllum lanatum var. croceum (Greene) Jeps. — Sierra woolly sunflower; endemic to the Sierra Nevada in California.
Eriophyllum lanatum var. grandiflorum (A.Gray) Jeps. — Large flowered woolly sunflower; northern California, Oregon.
Eriophyllum lanatum var. hallii  Constance — Fort Tejon woolly sunflower,  Hall's woolly sunflower; endemic to the Tehachapi Mountains in Kern County, and Sierra Madre Mountains in Santa Barbara County, in southern California.
Eriophyllum lanatum var. integrifolium (Hook.) Smiley — Oregon sunshine; California, Idaho, Montana, Nevada, Oregon, Utah, Washington, Wyoming.
Eriophyllum lanatum var. lanatum — Idaho, Montana, Oregon, Washington.
Eriophyllum lanatum var. lanceolatum (Howell) Jeps. — endemic to the Klamath Mountains, in NW California and SW Oregon.
Eriophyllum lanatum var. leucophyllum (DC.) W.R.Carter — British Columbia, Oregon, Washington.
Eriophyllum lanatum var. obovatum (Greene) H.M.Hall — Southern Sierra woolly sunflower; endemic to the western Sierra Nevada and the San Bernardino Mountains in California.

Distribution and habitat
Eriophyllum lanatum is native to western North America. It is most common across California, also growing north through Oregon into British Columbia and east through Idaho into Wyoming, and through Nevada into Utah. This species has only been collected from Mexico once, on Guadalupe Island, and it is most likely extirpated there.

It can be found (for instance in California) in chaparral, oak woodland, mixed evergreen forest, and yellow pine forest and other conifer forests, grassland, and sagebrush scrub habitats. It commonly grows in dry, open places below  in elevation. It prefers full sun and well-drained soil, but it also grows on rocky slopes and bluffs.

References

Further reading

External links

 Calflora Database: Eriophyllum lanatum (Common woolly sunflower, Wooly sunflower)
Jepson Manual eFlora (TJM2) treatment of Eriophyllum lanatum
USDA Plants Profile for Eriophyllum lanatum (common woolly sunflower)
U.C. Calphotos gallery: Eriophyllum lanatum images
Wildflowers of the Pacific Northwest:  Eriophyllum lanatum — photos, description, Northwest distribution map.
Lady Bird Johnson Wildflower Center, University of Texas: Eriophyllum lanatum

lanatum
Flora of British Columbia
Flora of California
Flora of Mexican Pacific Islands
Flora of Nevada
Flora of Utah
Flora of the Cascade Range
Flora of the Great Basin
Flora of the Klamath Mountains
Flora of the Sierra Nevada (United States)
Flora of the Northwestern United States
Flora without expected TNC conservation status
Natural history of the California chaparral and woodlands
Plants described in 1813
Taxa named by Frederick Traugott Pursh